Memphis Jewish High School (also known as Kadima Memphis Jewish High School or The Memphis Jewish High School) in Memphis, Tennessee, began operation in August 2006, and closed May 31, 2010. It was a Modern-Orthodox Jewish co-educational school. It was a dual-curriculum Hebrew - English school founded by Andrew and Jan Groveman, Jack and Marilyn Belz, and Mark and Sally Wender. 
It used the Harkness Table approach to teaching.

The school produced a monthly student-run newspaper, called The Kadima Khronicle, and a student-run yearly yearbook.  There were also plans to create a literary magazine.  Kadima, which is Hebrew for "moving forward," and MJHS's school motto. The motto reflects what Groveman had in mind for the students' future, and education.

The Memphis Jewish High School maintained a Community Service Committee (Hebrew: TIkkun Olam). It focused its attention on charities, as well as active community service at places such as the Memphis Jewish Home, a retirement home, and Plough Towers, another retirement community.

In addition to the Harkness Table method, MJHS also featured an extensive technological program that incorporated Apple MacBook laptop computers into the classroom. While the technology course was optional, all students used the computers in every class. Richard Ireland was the Master Technology Teacher at MJHS. Each classroom featured a large 'Smart' Board, motorized drop-down screen, projector, and audio system. Each classroom was equipped to project cable, VGA, DVI, mini-DVI, and Component video signals. The audio system in each classroom produced the audio that accompanies cable and component video, as well as computer and CD playback audio. The Mathematics Department, headed by former Head of Mathematics for Shelby County, Ann Indingaro, incorporated this technology into the classroom.

The History
The Memphis Jewish High School was a co-educational inclusive modern orthodox institution. The Memphis Jewish High School was a comprehensive four-year high school enrolling Jewish students in grade nine through twelve. The school opened August 14, 2006 with a ninth grade student body. The Memphis Jewish High School planned to add a grade each year and its first graduating class was in June 2010. The Memphis Jewish High School has been accepted as an official candidate for SACS/CASI accreditation through the Southern Association of Colleges and Schools. Memphis Jewish High School is a member of the College Board and the Educational Records Bureau.

Learning at Memphis Jewish High School was a cooperative enterprise in which the students and teachers worked together as partners. All classes were taught using the Harkness Method. Around the Harkness table, classmates learn by discussing their thoughts and ideas.

The school closed May 31, 2010.

References

External links
 Memphis Jewish High School archived website
 Founders working to open new Memphis Jewish High School in fall 2006 Memphis Business Journal, January 20, 2006

Educational institutions established in 2006
Schools in Memphis, Tennessee
Defunct schools in Tennessee
Jews and Judaism in Memphis, Tennessee
2006 establishments in Tennessee
Educational institutions disestablished in 2010
Modern Orthodox Jewish day schools in the United States